The Absolutist is a novel written by Irish-Canadian novelist John Boyne. It was first published in 2011 by Doubleday.

References 

2011 Irish novels
Novels by John Boyne
Doubleday (publisher) books